Meraa Dost Meraa Dushman is a 1984 Indian Bollywood action film directed by Raj Khosla and produced by Johny Bakshi. It stars Sanjeev Kumar, Shatrughan Sinha, Smita Patil in pivotal roles. The music was composed by Laxmikant-Pyarelal.

Cast 
Sanjeev Kumar as Goli Chacha
Shatrughan Sinha as Shakti Singh
Smita Patil as Lali
Danny Denzongpa as Shaitan Singh
Johnny Walker as Mulayam Singh
Mukri as Harkishan
Master Bhagwan as Bhiku
Trilok Kapoor as Bahadur Singh
Indrani Mukherjee as Janki
Geeta Behl as Kesar / Phoolwati
Shivraj as Bandit
Vikas Anand as Bandit

Music 
Lyrics: Anand Bakshi

External links 

1980s Hindi-language films
1984 films
Films scored by Laxmikant–Pyarelal